Kutumb was a daily Indian television drama telecast on Sony Entertainment Television. The show was aired on 29 October 2001 and went off air on 7 February 2003. The show had two seasons but the seasons' plots were not related. However, both series revolve around the principal characters of Pratham (Hiten Tejwani) and Gauri (Gauri Pradhan), and their love and kutumb (family).

Summary Season 1 

Kutumb meaning family, is the story of Pratham and Gauri, and their interactions with their joint family. Pratham is the eldest son of Mittal family, and Gauri hails from a middle-class Agarwal family. At first they are enemies, but end up getting married and living in a large joint family (kutumb). This family is very loving and caring. It becomes the reason for the husband and wife to fall in love and start a memorable journey together. They go through trials and tribulations but emerge victorious in the end, as their relationship stays untarnished. They return to their kutumb and live happily ever after.

Plot Season 1 

The Mittal family is successful and rich but very grounded in their traditions and culture. Of the four Mittal sons, the eldest Umesh is married to Gayatri and has three children - Nandini, Pratham (Hiten Tejwani) and Gautam. Rajesh is married to Archana and they also have three children - Samay, Tushar and Diya. Sanjay is a widower, who often has imaginary conversations with his late wife Maya (Sakshi Tanwar) and their three kids are - Siddharth, Riya and Richa. Ajay and Kavita have no kids of their own and instead dote on all the other kids. The other kids who are also part of the family are Sanskar and Sanskriti, who are Umesh's sister's children.

Pratham is revealed to be the spoilt brat in the family and dearly loved by everyone, much to his father Umesh's frustration.

In contrast, Gauri Agarwal (Gauri Pradhan Tejwani), comes from a middle class nuclear family and takes no nonsense from anyone. Gauri's family includes her father, mother, sister Preeti and brother Shashank.

Pratham's own sister, Nandini (Poonam Narula) married young as per her father's wishes but the marriage results in divorce. Her ex-husband also doesn't want anything to do with their son Shobhit. Nandini's father is remorseful for having chosen the wrong man for her and wants her to remarry but she decides marriage is not for her.

At the same college, Gauri hates everything Pratham stands for - a lack of principles and his being rich and entitled. Pratham loses the Class President election to Gauri and to teach her a lesson locks himself with her in a room insinuating they were fooling around. When the media gets whiff of this, the incident is blown out of proportion and their conservative families decide that the two must be married. Pratham takes this as an opportunity to make Gauri's life a living hell. Under family pressure, Gauri gives in and the two are married.

How the two cope with their differences, and eventually fall in love with another form the crux of the story.

Cast Season 1 

 Hiten Tejwani as Pratham Mittal
 Gauri Pradhan as Gauri Agarwal / Gauri Pratham Mittal
 Amita Chandekar as Anu 
  Sai Ballal as Umesh Mittal, Pratham's Father 
  Shama Deshpande as Gayatri Umesh Mittal, Pratham's Mother
 Poonam Narula as Nandini Mittal, Pratham's Sister 
 Manorama as Chhoti Dadi, Pratham's Grandmother 
 Lily Patel as Badi Dadi, Pratham's Grandmother 
 Brijendra Kala as Sanjay Mittal, Pratham's Uncle 
 Sakshi Tanwar as Maya Sanjay Mittal
 Rituraj Singh as Ajay Mittal, Pratham's Uncle
 Jayati Bhatia as Kavita Ajay Mittal, Pratham's Aunt
 Ali Asgar as Samay Mittal, Pratham's Cousin
 Pooja Ghai Rawal as Natasha Samay Mittal
  Monalika Bhonsle as Shruti
 Kishwer Merchant as Swati
 Pracheen Chauhan as Tushar Mittal, Pratham's Cousin 
 Vaishali Saini as Riya Mittal, Pratham's Cousin
 Varun Badola as Advocate Rahul
 Rohit Bakshi as Ketan
 Shweta Basu Prasad as Vanshita, Anu Daughter
 Harsh Khurana as Manav
 Manoj Bidwai as Gautam
 Dheeraj Sarna as Yash, Pratham's Friend
 Abhijit Khurana as Hiten, Pratham's Friend

Soundtrack season 1

Plot Season 2 
The story of Season 2 is completely different from Season 1. Loosely based on A Walk to Remember, the second season shows Pratham as a rich spoilt brat who is disinterested in studies. Gauri on the other hand is the college topper and actively participates in drama activities. Their opposite natures initially lead to fights but while practicing for a college play, they develop feelings for each other. However, Pratham's parents oppose the relationship as they feel Gauri is a middle class girl and does not fit in with their family.

Pratham and Gauri are very much in love and elope. They face financial hardships but eventually settle down in their new world. Everything is perfect, till Gauri is diagnosed with cancer and is given a few months to live by the doctors. Pratham is shattered but continues to take care of her during her treatment. Gauri is finally cured and Pratham's family also accepts her. But as fate would have it, Gauri soon dies in a car accident instead.

Cast Season 2

Soundtrack season 2

External links 
 Kutumb official site

Balaji Telefilms television series
Sony Entertainment Television original programming
Indian television soap operas
2001 Indian television series debuts
2003 Indian television series endings
Television shows set in Pune